A maid is a female domestic servant employed for housekeeping.

The Maid may refer to:
The Maid, an Egyptian film starring Ashraf Fahmy
The Maid (1991 film), an American film 
The Maid (2005 film), a Singaporean horror film
The Maid (2009 film), a Chilean comedy-drama film
The Maid (2020 film), a Thai horror film
"The Maid" (Seinfeld), an episode of the American sitcom Seinfeld
The Maid: A Novel, a novel by Nita Prose

The Maids may refer to:
The Maids (Les Bonnes), a play by the French dramatist Jean Genet 
The Maids (film), a film adaptation of the play of the same name

See also 
 Maid (disambiguation)